The Perry National Guard Armory is a 210 x 120 foot structure of native stone.  It was constructed by the Work Projects Administration, and employed 90,000 man-hours of labor.  It has been used for public gatherings as well as the headquarters of Battery C, 158th Field Artillery, Oklahoma National Guard.

References

Romanesque Revival architecture in Oklahoma
Buildings and structures completed in 1936
Buildings and structures in Noble County, Oklahoma
Armories on the National Register of Historic Places in Oklahoma
Works Progress Administration in Oklahoma
National Register of Historic Places in Noble County, Oklahoma